"Howlin' at the Moon" is a song written and recorded by Hank Williams. It rose to number 3 on the Hot Country Singles chart in 1951. The song also appeared on the soundtrack of alternate history TV series, For All Mankind.

Song history 
The up-tempo "Howlin' at the Moon" celebrates the giddiness of true love. Lyrically, the song reflects Williams' sense of humor and love of hunting. The title is punctuated by the hound dog yodels of fiddler Jerry Rivers. In his book Hank Williams: The Biography, writer Colin Escott observes, "The performance tears along...It was but a short step from there to rockabilly." Williams recorded the song at Castle Studio in Nashville on March 16, 1951. Williams was backed on the session by members of his Drifting Cowboys band, including: Jerry Rivers (fiddle), Don Helms (steel guitar), Sammy Pruett (electric guitar), Jack Shook (rhythm guitar), Ernie Newton (or "Cedric Rainwater") aka Howard Watts (bass), and either Owen Bradley or producer Fred Rose on piano. The B-side of "Howlin' at the Moon", the ballad "I Can't Help It (If I'm Still in Love with You)", outperformed the A-side on the charts (peaking at number 2).

Williams disciple George Jones recorded this song for his 1960 album George Jones Salutes Hank Williams.

Chart performance

References

Bibliography 

1951 songs
Songs written by Hank Williams
Hank Williams songs
MGM Records singles
Song recordings produced by Fred Rose (songwriter)